General elections were held in Tuvalu on 27 August 1977. As there were no political parties, all candidates ran as independents, with Toaripi Lauti remaining Chief Minister. Voter turnout was 78.8%.

Background
Following a 1974 referendum, the Ellice Islands separated from the Gilbert and Ellice Islands. The Tuvaluan Order 1975, which took effect on 1 October 1975, recognised Tuvalu as a separate British dependency with its own government. The second stage occurred on 1 January 1976 when separate administrations were created out of the civil service of the Gilbert and Ellice Islands.

A new House of Assembly was established with eight members. Prior to the 1977 elections, the number was increased to twelve. The four islands with a population of over 1,000 elected two members and the other four islands elected one member.

Results
Minister Isakaia Paeniu lost his seat.

Elected members

Aftermath
Following the elections, Toaripi Lauti was re-elected Chief Minister on 1 October. The House of the Assembly was renamed the Parliament of Tuvalu after independence in October 1978.

References

Tuvalu
Elections in Tuvalu
Election
Non-partisan elections
Election and referendum articles with incomplete results